Céline Henriette Bianca van Gerner (born 1 December 1994) is a retired Dutch elite artistic gymnast, two-time Olympian, and bronze medalist at the 2018 European Championships

Early life
Van Gerner was born in Zwolle, Netherlands, but grew up in Emmeloord. She took up gymnastics at age seven at a local club in Emmeloord, Netherlands, and later moved to Turncentrum Sportstad Heerenveen (TSH). She is a two-time Olympian, having competed in the London games in 2012 (where she finished 12th in the all-around and 9th on UB) and again at the Rio games in 2016 as part of the Dutch team; they are the first Dutch team to participate in the games since 1976 (team members Céline van Gerner, Sanne Wevers, Lieke Wevers, Vera van Pol, Eythora Thorsdottir) and finished in 7th place.

Career

Junior

2008 — 2009 
Van Gerner competed at the 2008 EK Juniors Clermont Ferrand in France where the Netherlands placed 3rd in team competition. In 2009, she became the Dutch Junior Champion. She later competed at EYOF, Finland where she placed 3rd in the AA, 3rd on BB, 3rd in team final. She was named Sportswoman of the year in the province of Flevoland and Sporting Talent of the year for the Northeast KNGU.

Senior

2010
Van Gerner competed at WK Rotterdam where she placed 19th in the AA and 9th in the team final. Later she competed at EK Birmingham and placed fourth on balance beam. She was again named Sportswoman of the year in the province of Flevoland and Sportswoman of the year for the Northeast KNGU.

2011
Van Gerner competed at the Dutch Championships where she placed 1st in the all-around and on floor exercise and uneven bars. She competed at EK Berlin where she placed 7th in the All-Around and on Uneven Bars.  Later that year Van Gerner competed at the World Championships in Tokyo where she placed 17th in the All-Around. She competed at the Challenger Cup Cottbus where she placed second on balance beam. She once again won the award for Sportswoman of the year for the Northeast KNGU.

2012
In 2012 van Gerner competed at EK Brussels where she placed fifth on the uneven bars. She competed at three Challenger Cups, Ghent, where she won on uneven bars and got second on balance beam, Maribor, where she won on both uneven bars and balance beam, and Cottbus, where she got second on uneven bars. At the Dutch Championships she was won gold in the all-around and on uneven bars and won silver on balance beam. She competed at the 2012 Summer Olympic Games in London where she placed 12th in the All-Around and was the first reserve on uneven bars. She once again won the award for Sportswoman of the year for the Northeast KNGU.

2013 — 2014
In 2013, van Gerner competed at the Dutch Championships where she won silver in the all-around.

In 2014, she competed at the 2014 World Artistic Gymnastics Championships in Nanning, China, but did not qualify to any finals.

2015
Van Gerner competed at the European Games in Baku, Azerbaijan where she placed 5th on uneven bars and won a bronze medal in Team Competition alongside Lieke Wevers and Lisa Top. She later competed at the WOGA Classic in Dallas, Texas. She won a gold medal on balance beam and a silver medal in the all-around. Again, she won the award for Sportswoman of the year for the Northeast KNGU.

2016
In 2016 van Gerner competed at the Stuttgart World Cup where she placed 6th. She later competed at the Dutch Championships where she placed second in the all-around. At the Olympic Qualifying Tournament in Heerenvee, she placed third and was added to the Olympic Team alongside Sanne Wevers, Lieke Wevers, Vera van Pol, Eythora Thorsdottir. The team placed seventh at the 2016 Olympics in Rio de Janeiro. Again she won the award for Sportswoman of the year for the Northeast KNGU.

2018
In 2018 van Gerner competed at the Koper Cup Challenge where she won gold on the balance beam and silver on uneven bars, behind Barbora Mokošová.  She later competed at the Dutch Championships where she won silver in the all-around and on balance beam and won gold on uneven bars. Later she competed at the Heerenveen Friendly where the Netherlands won silver in the team competition. She was named to the team to compete at the 2018 European Championships. There she won bronze with the Netherlands in the team competition and placed fourth on the floor exercise. She made headlines during the floor exercise final due to wearing full cat make-up during her performance. In September it was announced that van Gerner would forgo competing at the 2018 World Championships and get surgery on her achilles tendon, which has been bothering her since 2016. In October FIG introduced a ban on theatrical make-up, citing van Gerner as the example.

2019 
In May it was announced that van Gerner would compete at the European Games alongside Naomi Visser.  The following month she pulled out after deciding she was still physically recovering from her surgery. She announced her retirement in August, stating that her heart was no longer fully in it.

Competitive history

Senior

References

External links 

 
 

1994 births
Living people
Dutch female artistic gymnasts
Olympic gymnasts of the Netherlands
Gymnasts at the 2012 Summer Olympics
Gymnasts at the 2016 Summer Olympics
European Games bronze medalists for the Netherlands
Gymnasts at the 2015 European Games
European Games medalists in gymnastics
Sportspeople from Zwolle
20th-century Dutch women
21st-century Dutch women